Monk Bretton railway station was a railway station that served the village of Monk Bretton, South Yorkshire, England. It was opened in 1876 by the Midland Railway in their characteristic country style and is sited on the line between Barnsley Court House and Cudworth. The station was double track with two flanking platforms approached from the nearby road over bridge, the main buildings being on the Barnsley bound platform. A signal box, in typical Midland Railway design, was situated at the outer end of the Cudworth platform.

The station closed on 27 September 1937 though the line to Monk Bretton remained open and now serves a glassworks in the village where the line stops.

References

"Railway Memories No.8", David Green & Peter Rose, Bellcode Books. 

Disused railway stations in Barnsley
Former Midland Railway stations
Railway stations in Great Britain opened in 1876
Railway stations in Great Britain closed in 1937